Green is the fourth studio album by American thrash metal band Forbidden.

Track listing

 Track 14 features a hidden track after six minutes of silence.

Credits
Russ Anderson – vocals
Craig Locicero – lead guitar
Tim Calvert – rhythm guitar
Matt Camacho – bass
Steve Jacobs – drums
 Produced by Patrick Coughlin and Forbidden
 Mastered by Steve Hall

References

Forbidden (band) albums
1997 albums
GUN Records albums
Groove metal albums